Robin Weisz (born May 30, 1956) is an American politician. He is a member of the North Dakota House of Representatives from the 14th District, serving since 1996. He is a member of the Republican party.

References

Living people
1956 births
Politicians from Bismarck, North Dakota
Republican Party members of the North Dakota House of Representatives
21st-century American politicians